Delias gabia is a butterfly in the family Pieridae. It was described by Jean Baptiste Boisduval in 1832. It is endemic to New Guinea.

The wingspan is about 52–58 mm.

Subspecies
D. g. gabia (New Guinea, Waigeu, Gebe Island)
D. g. bantina Fruhstorfer, 1910 (Trobriand)
D. g. callistrate Grose-Smith, 1897 (Fergusson, Goodenough Island)
D. g. masinessa Fruhstorfer, 1913 (Yule)
D. g. naokoae Nakano, 1995 (Yapen Island)
D. g. zarate Grose-Smith, 1900 (New Guinea, Trobriand Islands, Yule Island)

References

External links
Delias at Markku Savela's Lepidoptera and Some Other Life Forms

gabia
Butterflies described in 1832
Endemic fauna of New Guinea